Jaya Shopping Centre was redeveloped supermarket into an approximately 260,000 square feet lifestyle mall in 2014. It is located at Section 14, Petaling Jaya, Selangor, Malaysia.

Jaya Shopping Centre is a seven-storey suburban retail mall comprising more than 120 retailers and diners, an eight-screen cineplex and a supermarket. The mall also provides four basement floors of parking, which can accommodate more than 780 vehicles.

References

Further reading
 
 
 

Petaling Jaya
Shopping malls in Selangor